The World Junior Alpine Skiing Championships 2017 were the 36th World Junior Alpine Skiing Championships, held between 6–14 March 2017 in Åre, Sweden.

Medal winners

Men's events

Women's events

Team event

External links
World Junior Alpine Skiing Championships 2017 results at fis-ski.com

World Junior Alpine Skiing Championships
2017 in alpine skiing
Alpine skiing competitions in Sweden
2017 in Swedish sport
Sport in Åre
March 2017 sports events in Europe